Jessie Rogers is a Brazilian-American pornographic actress.

Early life
Rogers was born in Goiânia, Brazil. She attended El Camino High School in South San Francisco, California in 2008. She did some mainstream modeling in New York prior to her adult film career.

Career

Pornographic film career
Rogers debuted in the adult film industry a few days after her eighteenth birthday in August 2011. In 2012, she had a breast augmentation, taking her from an A to a D cup. That same year, she portrayed Emma Bunton in an adult film parody of the Spice Girls.

Personal life

Activism
Rogers became an advocate for mandatory condom use in pornographic films and workers' compensation for performers shortly after her retirement. On April 24, 2013, she appeared at the California State Assembly's Labor and Employment Committee and testified in support of AB 332, a bill requiring pornographic actors to wear condoms during all sex scenes filmed in California.

Awards and nominations

References

External links

 
 
 

Year of birth missing (living people)
Living people
People from Goiânia
Brazilian emigrants to the United States
Brazilian Internet celebrities
Brazilian pornographic film actresses
Brazilian female adult models
People from South San Francisco, California
Pornographic film actors from California